Sir Thomas William Shakespeare, 3rd Baronet,  (born 11 May 1966) is an English sociologist and bioethicist. He has achondroplasia and uses a wheelchair.

Early life and education
Son of Sir William Geoffrey Shakespeare, 2nd Baronet, and Susan Mary, daughter of A. Douglas Raffel, of Colombo, Sri Lanka, his grandfather, Sir Geoffrey Shakespeare, was made a baronet following long service as a Member of Parliament and in various senior government roles. While still a student, Tom was featured in a television documentary by Lord Snowdon connected to his 1976 report 'Integrating the Disabled' about his restricted growth, along with his father, a prominent medical practitioner, who was also born with achondroplasia. His mother was a nurse of Sri Lankan Burgher descent.

Shakespeare was educated at Radley College, Oxfordshire, taking A-levels in English, History, and History of Art; and Pembroke College, Cambridge, where he matriculated in 1984 to read Anglo-Saxon, Norse and Celtic. He gained a MPhil degree from King's College, Cambridge, in 1991.

Career

Shakespeare then lectured in sociology at the University of Sunderland from 1993 and returned to King's College in 1995 to obtain his PhD degree. His father died in 1996 and Shakespeare inherited his baronetcy, but does not use the title. He is also a campaigner for disability rights, a writer on disability, genetics and bio-ethics and was the co-author of The Sexual Politics of Disability (1996).

He studied political science at Cambridge University. As a student, he supported liberation movements such as feminism, anti-racism and lesbian and gay rights. During his MPhil, he wrote a book about the politics of disability. He also wrote the book Disability Rights and Wrongs published by Routledge in 2006 and edited Arguing About Disability published in 2009 by Routledge.

He has worked as a research fellow at both Newcastle University and Leeds University, and has worked for the World Health Organization in Geneva.  Shakespeare was a coauthor and coeditor of the 2011 World Report on Disability, published by the World Health Organization and World Bank. He served as a member of the Arts Council of England between 2003 and 2008.  He has presented programmes on BBC Radio 4, including A Point of View.

Shakespeare is (as of 2021) Professor of Disability Research in the medical faculty at the London School of Hygiene and Tropical Medicine, and was previously Professor of Disability Research in the medical faculty at the University of East Anglia (UEA). At UEA, he conducted research, including one regarding group singing and its beneficial effects against depression and anxiety; the findings were published in the academic journal Medical Humanities.

In July 2018 Shakespeare was elected a Fellow of the British Academy.

Shakespeare was appointed Commander of the Order of the British Empire (CBE) in the 2021 Birthday Honours for services to disability research.

Personal life
In 2002 Shakespeare married dancer and disability rights campaigner Caroline Bowditch. By 2010 he had split with his wife and he lived in Geneva with his partner, Alana. He has two children, both of whom also have achondroplasia; his daughter Ivy is a social worker, and his son Robert is a civil servant. His first grandchild was born in 2020. Owing to a spinal cord injury in 2008, Shakespeare mainly uses a wheelchair, but with physiotherapy had regained the ability to walk with leg splints and cane.
In 2016 he featured on the ITV show 500 Questions, winning £14,000 by answering 42 out of 50 questions. He received a standing ovation for his efforts. His father's maternal half-brother was Conservative politician Sir Nigel Fisher.

Arms

References

External links
 Personal website
UEA website

1966 births
Living people
People educated at Radley College
Alumni of Pembroke College, Cambridge
Alumni of King's College, Cambridge
Academics of Newcastle University
Academics of the University of Sunderland
Academics of the University of East Anglia
English sociologists
Baronets in the Baronetage of the United Kingdom
English Quakers
People with dwarfism
Contestants on British game shows
English people with disabilities
English people of Sri Lankan descent
Fellows of the British Academy
Commanders of the Order of the British Empire
Scientists with disabilities